Stevan Milošević (born 13 October 1985) is a Montenegrin  professional basketball player who last played for Union Olimpija of the Slovenian League. He is a 2.11 m tall center.

References

External links
 Eurobasket.com profile
 FIBA Profile

1985 births
Living people
ABA League players
AEL Limassol B.C. players
BC Nizhny Novgorod players
Centers (basketball)
JDA Dijon Basket players
KK Budućnost players
KK Crvena zvezda players
KK Mornar Bar players
KK Olimpija players
KK Partizan players
Köln 99ers players
Montenegrin expatriate basketball people in Serbia
Montenegrin men's basketball players
Trabzonspor B.K. players
Traiskirchen Lions players